Olivier Kemen (born 20 July 1996) is a professional footballer who plays for Turkish club Kayserispor as a midfielder. Born in Cameroon, he was a youth international for France.

Club career
Kemen is a youth exponent from Metz. He made his Ligue 1 debut for Lyon on 28 February 2016 against Paris Saint-Germain replacing Rafael after 75 minutes in a 2–1 home win.

He signed for Chamois Niortais in July 2019, and went on to make 62 appearances in Ligue 2 for the club.

International career
Born in Cameroon, Kemen moved to France at a young age. He is a youth international for France.

Career statistics

Club

Notes

References

External links
 

Living people
1996 births
Association football midfielders
French footballers
France youth international footballers
Cameroonian footballers
French sportspeople of Cameroonian descent
Cameroonian emigrants to France
Ligue 1 players
Ligue 2 players
Süper Lig players
Olympique Lyonnais players
Gazélec Ajaccio players
Chamois Niortais F.C. players
Kayserispor footballers
French expatriate footballers
Cameroonian expatriate footballers
Expatriate footballers in Turkey
French expatriate sportspeople in Turkey
Cameroonian expatriate sportspeople in Turkey